Major-General Sir Charles Walker Robinson,  (April 3, 1836 – May 20, 1924) was a Canadian-born British Army officer and writer on military subjects.

Born in Toronto, Ontario, the son of John Beverley Robinson, he attended Trinity College, before joining the British Army as a second lieutenant in the Prince Consort's Own (Rifle Brigade). He fought in the  Indian Rebellion of 1857, then the Third Anglo-Ashanti War, then the Anglo-Zulu War.  He became a Major-General in 1892. He was Knight Commander of the Order of the Bath, and a Lieutenant-Governor of Royal Hospital Chelsea. He died in London, England.

Robinson was designated a Person of National Historic Significance in 1938 by the Canadian government.

Works
 Life of Sir John Beverley Robinson (1904)
 Canada and Canadian defence: the defensive policy of the Dominion in relation to the character of her frontier, the events of the War of 1812–14, and her position to-day (1910)
 Wellington's campaigns, Peninsula—Waterloo, 1808-15; also Moore's campaign of Corunna (1914)

References

External links
 

 

1836 births
1924 deaths
Trinity College (Canada) alumni
Canadian non-fiction writers
Knights Commander of the Order of the Bath
Persons of National Historic Significance (Canada)
British Army generals